Jornada is a newspaper published in La Paz, Bolivia. The newspaper began publication in November 1964.

References

Newspapers published in Bolivia
Publications established in 1964
1964 establishments in Bolivia
Mass media in La Paz